Benjamin Orr (1947–2000) was an American musician.

Benjamin Orr may also refer to:

 Benjamin Orr (Massachusetts politician) (1772–1828), member of the U.S. House of Representatives
 Benjamin G. Orr (1762–1822), mayor of Washington, D.C.